Dharkayn Geenyo (Dharkayngeenyo, Darkeyn Genyo) is a town in the southern Sool region of Somalia.

Overview
It is located on the Somaliland-Ethiopia border. Dharkayn Geenyo is a historical town, it was an important border post during the Siad Barre government period with one of the biggest Somali military bases,. The town was the centre of clan skirmishes in 2016 and 2017.

Mayor
Siciid Warsame Cabdi

History
In the 1920's this area was named Dharkayn.

In a book published in England in 1951, Dharkayn Geenyo is listed under the name Darkein Genyo.

In January 1982, an officer relative of President Barre was murdered in Dharkayn Geenyo.

In July 1999, Garaad Cali Buraale Xasan Gaba'aweyte was installed as the new Garaad (chief) of the Qayaad clan in Dharkayn Geenyo.

In October 2010, Qayaad chief Garaad Cali Buraale held a clan meeting in Dharkayn Geenyo to discuss the relationship with Somaliland and other issues.

In 2014, the clan conflict was rekindled in Dharkayn Geenyo, when the Khatumo State's military killed a militia member of the Qayaad clan. The conflict is said to have been agitated by the diaspora, which provided supplies and other support. It is also said that the intervention of the Puntland government, which tried to use the incident for political purposes, made the situation worse. In August 2015, a preliminary agreement was reached in settlement talks between the clans.

In April 2016, a clan struggle erupted again in Dharkayn Geenyo, killing 10 people. The Sool state government, at the behest of the Somaliland government, intervened in this struggle. The cause was an incident six months earlier in which 15 people were seriously injured when a settlement fell apart. In June, another clan war broke out, killing more than 20 people. The Somaliland government dispatched troops. Because of this incident, most of the inhabitants of Dharkayn Geenyo were evacuated to Las Anod. In July, the death toll stood at 52, and the Somaliland president called representatives of the Dharkayn Geenyo and Dhumay clans to the presidential palace to review the situation.

In November 2016, one person was injured in a dispute between the two clans in neighboring Las Anod, but the town of Dharkayn Geenyo remained peaceful.

In April 2017, a delegation from the Somaliland government visited Dharkayn Geenyo and met with Qayaad chief Garaad Cali Buraale and others.

In February 2018, Qayaad chief Garaad Cali Buraale died in Las Anod.

In March 2020, Garaad Mukhtaar Garaad Cali Buraale inaugurated the new Garaad of the Qayaad clan in Dharkayn Geenyo. In conjunction with this, Somaliland's Minister of Information and Culture visited Dharkayn Geenyo for the groundbreaking ceremony of a $500,000 well. Also, one of the Dhulbahante clan elders Garad Jama Garad Ali stated at this inauguration ceremony that Dharkayn Geenyo is not part of Puntland or Somaliland. Also present at the inauguration were elders from the Puntland-dominated region.

In November 2020, a mine exploded in a village near Dharkayn Geenyo, killing three pastoralists. They are mines from the former Somalia-Ethiopia war and are sometimes exposed during the rainy season.

References

External links
(Dharkayn Geenyo)

Populated places in Sool, Somaliland